Sir Henry John Mordaunt, 12th Baronet (12 July 1867 – 15 January 1939) was an English baronet and cricketer. Mordaunt was a right-handed batsman who bowled right-arm fast.

Cricket career

Mordaunt made his first-class debut for Hampshire in the 1885 County Championship playing a single match in the club's final season with first-class status against Somerset. Mordaunt played as an all rounder.

After this, Mordaunt continued his education at Eton College, where he captained the college cricket team, and led Eton to victory over Harrow School at Lord's for the first time since 1876. Upon completing his education at Eton, Mordaunt attended King's College, Cambridge.

Mordaunt made his debut for Cambridge University against CI Thornton's XI. He played 15 first-class matches for Cambridge University between 1888 and 1889, with his final match for Cambridge the 1889 Varsity match against Oxford University at Lord's. In Mordaunt's 15 first-class matches for the University he scored 600 runs at a batting average of 23.07, with three half centuries and a single century which gave Mordaunt his highest first-class score of 127 against Oxford University in his final match for Cambridge. With the ball Mordaunt took 38 wickets at a bowling average of 20.39, with best figures of 4/29. In the field Mordaunt took 7 catches for the University.

During his time playing for the University, Mordaunt also played a single first-class match for an England XI against the touring Australians.

In 1889, Mordaunt made his debut for Middlesex against Lancashire. Mordaunt represented the county in seven first-class matches, playing four from 1889 to 1890, and then three further matches for the county in 1893, with his final first-class match for Middlesex coming against Kent.

In 1890, Mordaunt played a single first-class match for I Zingari against the Gentlemen of England, where he took figures of 5/17 in the Gentlemen's second innings. Mordaunt's final first-class match came his one and only appearance for the Marylebone Cricket Club against Cambridge University in 1896.

In Mordaunt's overall first-class career, he scored 729 runs at a batting average of 15.51, with three half centuries, one century and a high score of 127. With the ball Mordaunt took 49 wickets at a bowling average of 21.16, with one five wicket haul which gave him best bowling figures of 5/17.

Educational career

Mordaunt was Assistant Master at Felsted School in 1890; and Clifton College from 1891 to 1892. Mordaunt was also Chief Clerk of the London City Council Education Committee from 1904 to 1924.

Death

Mordaunt died at Westminster, London on 15 January 1939.

Family

Mordaunt became the 12th Baronet of the Mordaunt Baronets in 1934 following the death of his cousin Sir Osbert Mordaunt, 11th Baronet. Mordaunt's father John Mordaunt, brothers Eustace and Gerald and cousin Sir Osbert all played first-class cricket. His uncle, Sir Charles Mordaunt, 10th Baronet, was involved in a sensational divorce case of 1870 that concerned, among other things, a possible relationship between his wife Harriet and the Prince of Wales.

References

External links

1867 births
1939 deaths
19th-century English people
20th-century English people
People from Westminster
Cricketers from Greater London
People educated at Eton College
Alumni of King's College, Cambridge
English cricketers
Hampshire cricketers
Cambridge University cricketers
Middlesex cricketers
Mordaunt baronets
Schoolteachers from Bristol
I Zingari cricketers
Marylebone Cricket Club cricketers
Schoolteachers from Essex